Lithium fluoride is an inorganic compound with the chemical formula LiF. It is a colorless solid, that transitions to white with decreasing crystal size. Although odorless, lithium fluoride has a bitter-saline taste. Its structure is analogous to that of sodium chloride, but it is much less soluble in water. It is mainly used as a component of molten salts. Formation of LiF from the elements releases one of the highest energy per mass of reactants, second only to that of BeO.

Manufacturing
LiF is prepared from lithium hydroxide or lithium carbonate with hydrogen fluoride.

Applications

Precursor to LiPF6 for batteries
Lithium fluoride is reacted with hydrogen fluoride (HF) and phosphorus pentachloride to make lithium hexafluorophosphate, an ingredient in lithium ion battery electrolyte.

In molten salts
Fluorine is produced by the electrolysis of molten potassium bifluoride.  This electrolysis proceeds more efficiently when the electrolyte contains a few percent of LiF, possibly because it facilitates formation of an Li-C-F interface on the carbon electrodes. A useful molten salt, FLiNaK, consists of a mixture of LiF, together with sodium fluoride and potassium fluoride. The primary coolant for the Molten-Salt Reactor Experiment was FLiBe; LiF-BeF2 (66-33 mol%).

Optics
Because of the large band gap for LiF, its crystals are transparent to short wavelength ultraviolet radiation, more so than any other material. LiF is therefore used in specialized optics for the vacuum ultraviolet spectrum,  (See also magnesium fluoride). Lithium fluoride is used also as a diffracting crystal in X-ray spectrometry.

Radiation detectors

Nuclear reactors
Lithium fluoride (highly enriched in the common isotope lithium-7) forms the basic constituent of the preferred fluoride salt mixture used in liquid-fluoride nuclear reactors.  Typically lithium fluoride is mixed with beryllium fluoride to form a base solvent (FLiBe), into which fluorides of uranium and thorium are introduced.  Lithium fluoride is exceptionally chemically stable and LiF/BeF2 mixtures (FLiBe) have low melting points and the best neutronic properties of fluoride salt combinations appropriate for reactor use. MSRE used two different mixtures in the two cooling circuits.

Cathode for PLED and OLEDs
Lithium fluoride is widely used in PLED and OLED as a coupling layer to enhance electron injection.  The thickness of the LiF layer is usually around 1 nm. The dielectric constant (or relative permittivity) of LiF is 9.0.

Natural occurrence
Naturally occurring lithium fluoride is known as the extremely rare mineral griceite.

References

Lithium compounds
Fluorides
Alkali metal fluorides
Optical materials
Crystals
Metal halides
Rock salt crystal structure
Fluorine compounds